The Seattle School of Theology & Psychology is a private graduate school in Seattle, Washington.

History
The Seattle School of Theology & Psychology was initially established under the auspices of Western Seminary in 1997, becoming independent in 2000, and establishing itself in downtown Seattle in 2007. In 2011, the school changed its name from Mars Hill Graduate School to The Seattle School of Theology & Psychology.

Theology
The Seattle School is an interdisciplinary, multi-denominational institution. The Seattle School calls itself "a learning community informed by incarnational theology and a relational hermeneutic."

Academics
The school has one Master of Divinity degree program and two Master of Arts degree programs. The school's Counseling Psychology curriculum is a mix of psychodynamic modality, existential approach, attachment theory and object relations.

The school also offers non-credit certificate programs, including some offered at The Allender Center that offers non-credit certificates, workshops, and conferences on healing from trauma and abuse.

Accreditation and approvals
The Seattle School of Theology & Psychology is accredited by the Northwest Commission on Colleges and Universities. Additionally, the school is nationally accredited by the Association of Theological Schools in the United States and Canada (ATS). The school has "degree authorization" by the State of Washington and Title IV authorization by the Federal Department of Education for federal student financial assistance.

Notable faculty 
 Dan Allender

See also
Postmodern Christianity

References

External links
Official website

Transnational Association of Christian Colleges and Schools
Western Seminary
Seminaries and theological colleges in Washington (state)
Educational institutions established in 1997
Belltown, Seattle
1997 establishments in Washington (state)